Aberthin is a small village, just outside Cowbridge in the Vale of Glamorgan, South Wales, on the north side of a shallow valley, less than a mile northeast of Cowbridge across the A48 road. Cowbridge Comprehensive School lies just to the southwest of the village. About 250 metres to the south is an old quarry, with a "faulted strip of grey oolite". Aberthin is also the name of a brook, the River Aberthin. The village was served by the Aberthin Platform railway station between 1905 and 1920, now a field to the west of Aberthin.

Etymology
Thomas Morgan recorded an early belief that the village had been a place of druidic sacrifices, and that the name derived from the word Abertha (sacrifice). However, this derivation is now considered a folk etymology. As the Nant y Berthyn's confluence (or "Aber" in Welsh) with the River Thaw located just to the west of the village's centre, the name is most likely a contraction of "Aber-Nant-y-Berthyn".

Notable landmarks 

It has no shops, but does have two pubs, a village hall which when built in 1749 was created as Wales's second purpose-built Calvinistic Methodist meeting house, and a notable tree in the middle of the roundabout. The Methodist church and village was visited in 1746 by Howell Harries and it was at the church where Peter Williams gave a speech in which he was disowned by the Methodists. Houses in the area include Llansannor Court and Great House, Aberthin.

Culture
The village hall committee organises many events throughout the year, such as a duck race (where plastic yellow ducks are raced down the stream), a free bonfire and fireworks display (held on the Downs overlooking the village), quiz nights, amateur dramatics, barn dances, and an annual Village Day, which has a barbecue, live music and a dog show.

References

External links 

 www.geograph.co.uk : photos of Aberthin and surrounding area
 

Villages in the Vale of Glamorgan